Earth Crisis is a roots reggae album released by Steel Pulse in January 1984.  It is Steel Pulse's fifth studio album. On the album cover are pictures of American President Ronald Reagan, Soviet leader Yuri Andropov, Pope John Paul II, a Ku Klux Klansman, a Vietnamese refugee, and other historical pictures.

Earth Crisis peaked at #154 on The Billboard 200 chart in 1984.

Metalcore band Earth Crisis was called making reference to this album, because its cover portrayed many of the things they "would stand against", such as the starving African children, the two blocs of the Cold War and Klansmen.

Track listing
All tracks written by David Hinds.

"Steppin' Out" – 4:02
"Tightrope" – 4:10
"Throne of Gold" – 4:25
"Roller Skates" – 4:54
"Earth Crisis" – 4:55
"Bodyguard" – 4:26
"Grab Education" – 6:12
"Wild Goose Chase" – 5:40

Songs

Wild Goose Chase 

This song laments the misguided use of technology for purposes which the song's author, David Hinds, views as unnatural, such as in vitro fertilization.

Personnel
Steel Pulse
Steve "Grizzly" Nisbett - drums, percussion
Selwyn "Bumbo" Brown - keyboards, vocals
David Hinds - lead vocals, rhythm and lead guitar
Alphonso Martin - percussion, vocals
Ronald "Stepper" McQueen - bass
Jimmy Haynes - bass, lead guitar
Carl Atkins - saxophone solo

References

Steel Pulse albums
1984 albums
Elektra Records albums